Soemarno Sosroatmodjo (24 April 1911 – 9 January 1991) was an Indonesian soldier, doctor and  politician who served as both governor of Jakarta and Minister of Home Affairs of Indonesia.

He served two terms as Governor of Jakarta. His first term as governor was from 29 January 1960, until 26 August 1964. He was appointed Indonesian Minister of the Interior on 27 August 1964, and his deputy governor at the time, the painter artist Henk Ngantung replacing him as Jakarta governor. Soemarno Sosroatmojo served as a government minister until 28 March 1966.

With the failing health of Ngantung, President Sukarno requested from Soemarno Sosroatmodjo to re-assume the position of governor on 15 July 1965, for a second term until 28 April 1966, when Ali Sadikin became governor.

Soemarno Sosroatmodjo was married and was survived by his wife and seven children.

References

Indonesian politicians
1911 births
Javanese people
1991 deaths
Padjadjaran University alumni
Vanderbilt University alumni
People from Jember Regency